{{Taxobox
| name = Nesarpalus
| image = Nesarpalus fortunatus (Wollaston, 1863) (16135642562).png
| image_caption = Nesarpalus fortunatus
| regnum = Animalia
| phylum = Arthropoda
| classis = Insecta
| ordo = Coleoptera
| subordo = Adephaga
| familia = Carabidae
| genus = Nesarpalus| genus_authority = Bedel, 1897
}}Nesarpalus' is a genus of beetles in the family Carabidae, containing the following species:

 Nesarpalus cimensis (Cockerell, 1922)
 Nesarpalus empiricus (Wollaston, 1865)
 Nesarpalus fortunatus (Wollaston, 1863)
 Nesarpalus gregarius (Fauvel, 1897)
 Nesarpalus micans (Wollaston, 1863)
 Nesarpalus pelagicus (Wollaston, 1865)
 Nesarpalus sanctaecrucis (Wollaston, 1864)
 Nesarpalus solitarius (Wollaston, 1863)
 Nesarpalus uyttenboogaarti'' Emden, 1929

References

Harpalinae
Carabidae genera
Arthropods of Madeira